Walter Wanger (born Walter Feuchtwanger; July 11, 1894 – November 18, 1968) was an American film producer active from the 1910s, his career concluding with the turbulent production of Cleopatra, his last film, in 1963. He began at Paramount Pictures in the 1920s and eventually worked at virtually every major studio as either a contract producer or an independent. He also served as President of the Academy of Motion Picture Arts and Sciences from 1939 to October 1941 and from December 1941 to 1945. Strongly influenced by European films, Wanger developed a reputation as an intellectual and a socially conscious movie executive who produced provocative message movies and glittering romantic melodramas. He achieved notoriety when, in 1951, he shot and wounded the agent of his wife, Joan Bennett, because he suspected they were having an affair. He was convicted of the crime and served a four-month sentence, then returned to making movies.

After his death, his production company, Walter Wanger Productions, was sold to and absorbed by Time-Life Films, which also acquired many films produced by him and that company.

Early life
Wanger was born Walter Feuchtwanger in San Francisco. He was the son of Stella (Stettheimer) and Sigmund Feuchtwanger, who were from German Jewish families that had emigrated to the United States in the nineteenth century. Wanger was from a non-observant Jewish family, and in later life attended Episcopalian services with his wife. In order to assimilate into American society, his mother altered the family name simply to Wanger in 1908. The Wangers were well-connected and upper middle class, something which later differentiated Wanger from the other Jewish film moguls who came from more ordinary backgrounds.

Wanger attended Dartmouth College in Hanover, New Hampshire, where he developed an interest in amateur theatre. After leaving Dartmouth, Wanger became a professional theatrical producer in New York City where he worked with figures such as the influential British manager Harley Granville-Barker and the Russian actress Alla Nazimova.

Following the American entry into World War I in 1917, Wanger served with the United States Army in Italy initially in the Signal Corps where he worked as a pilot on reconnaissance missions, and later in propaganda operations directed at the Italian public. It was during this period that Wanger first came into contact with filmmaking. In April 1918 Wanger was transferred to the Committee on Public Information, and joined an effort to combat anti-war or pro-German sentiment in Allied Italy. This was partly accomplished through a series of short propaganda films screened in Italian cinemas promoting democracy and Allied war aims.

After the Allied victory, Wanger returned to the United States in 1919 and was discharged from the army. Wanger married silent film actress Justine Johnstone in 1919. He initially returned to theatre production, before a chance meeting with film producer Jesse Lasky drew him into the world of commercial filmmaking. Lasky was impressed with Wanger's ideas and his experiences in the theatre, and hired him to head a New York office vetting and acquiring books and plays for use as film stories for Famous Players-Lasky (later to become Paramount), which was then the largest film production company in the world.

Early career

Paramount
Wanger's job at Paramount was to help meet the studio's large annual requirement for fresh stories. One of Wanger's major successes in his early years with the company was his identification of the British novel The Sheik as a story with potential. In 1921 it was turned into an extremely successful film starring Rudolph Valentino. The film helped establish the popularity of the Orientalist genre, which Wanger returned to a number of times during his career.

By 1921, Wanger was unhappy with the terms he was receiving and left his job with Paramount. He travelled to Britain where he worked as a prominent cinema and theatre manager until 1924. While on a visit to London, Paramount key founder Jesse Lasky offered to appoint him as "general manager of production" on improved terms and Wanger accepted.

Wanger's second spell with Paramount lasted from 1924 to 1931, during which time his annual wage rose from $150,000 to $250,000. He was tasked with overseeing the work of the studio heads, which meant he had little involvement with the production of individual films. Because he was based in New York, Wanger worked more closely with the company's Astoria Studios in Queens. A rivalry developed between Wanger-influenced Astoria productions and those of B.P. Schulberg who ran the Paramount productions in Hollywood. From the mid-1920s, the company was rapidly overtaken by the recently formed Metro-Goldwyn-Mayer as the industry's leading company and this along with heavy losses incurred on big-budget films, led to Paramount's executives decision in 1927 to eventually close the New York operation and shift all production to Hollywood. Wanger opposed this move and felt he was being squeezed out of the company.

In 1926, Warner Brothers premièred Don Juan, a film with music and sound effects, and the following year released The Jazz Singer with dialogue and singing scenes. Along with other big companies, Paramount initially resisted adopting sound films and continued to exclusively make silent ones. Wanger convinced his colleagues of the importance of sound, and personally oversaw the conversion of 1928 silent baseball film Warming Up to sound. The sound version had synchronized music and sound effects without dialogue. After the film's successful release, the company switched dramatically away from silent to sound.

After being closed for a year, the Astoria Studios were re-opened in 1929 to make sound films, taking advantage of their close proximity to Broadway where many actors were recruited to appear in early Talkies. Wanger recruited large numbers of new performers including Maurice Chevalier, the Marx Brothers, Claudette Colbert, Jeanette MacDonald, Fredric March and Miriam Hopkins and directors such as George Cukor and Rouben Mamoulian. Wanger's New York films were often adapted from stage plays and focused on sophisticated comedies, often with European settings, while Schulberg concentrated on more populist stories in Hollywood. As the effects of the Great Depression hit the film industry in the early 1930s, the Astoria Studios increasingly struggled to produce box office hits, and in December 1931 it was closed down again. Wanger had been informed that his contract would not be renewed, and he had already left the company.

Columbia
After leaving Paramount, Wanger tried unsuccessfully to set himself up as an independent. Unable to secure financing for films, he joined Columbia Pictures in December 1931. Wanger was recruited by Harry Cohn, the studio's co-founder, who wanted to move Columbia away from its Poverty Row past by producing several special, large-budget productions each year to complement the bulk of the studio's low-budget films. Wanger was to take on a greater personal role in individual films than he had previously, although he always attempted to give directors and screenwriters creative freedom. In general his efforts were overshadowed by the more successful films made by Frank Capra for the studio.

Later career

Wanger was given an Honorary Academy Award in 1946 for his six years service as president of the Academy of Motion Picture Arts and Sciences. He refused another honorary Oscar in 1949 for Joan of Arc, out of anger over the fact that the film, which he felt was one of his best, had not been nominated for Best Picture.

His 1958 production of I Want to Live! starred Susan Hayward in an anti-capital punishment film that is one of the more highly regarded films on the subject. Hayward won her only Oscar for her role in the film.

In 1963, Wanger was nominated for an Academy Award for Best Picture for his production of Cleopatra.

In May 1966, Wanger received the Commendation of the Order of Merit, Italy's third-highest honor, from Consul General Alvaro v. Bettrani, "for your friendship and cooperation with the Italian government in all phases of the motion picture industry."

Personal life and death
Wanger married silent film actress Justine Johnstone in 1919. They divorced in 1938, and in 1940, he married actress Joan Bennett whom he divorced in 1965. They had two daughters, Stephanie (born 1943) and Shelley Antonia (born 1948), and Wanger adopted Bennett's daughter, Diana (born 1928), by her marriage to John Fox.

Wanger died of a heart attack, aged 74, in New York City. He was interred in the Home of Peace Cemetery in Colma, California.

Scandal

Starting in 1950, and continuing for 12 years, Wanger's wife Joan Bennett was represented by agent Jennings Lang. Formerly the vice president of the Jaffe Agency, he had become the head of MCA's West Coast television operations. On the afternoon of December 13, 1951, Bennett and Lang had a meeting to talk over an upcoming television show.

Bennett parked her Cadillac convertible in the lot at the back of the MCA offices, at Santa Monica Boulevard and Rexford Drive, across the street from the Beverly Hills Police Department, and she and Lang drove off in his car. Meanwhile, her husband drove by at about 2:30 p.m. and noticed his wife's car parked there. Half an hour later, he again saw her car there and stopped to wait. Bennett and Lang drove into the parking lot a few hours later and he walked her to her convertible. As she started the engine, turned on the headlights and prepared to drive away, Lang leaned on the car, with both hands raised to his shoulders, and talked to her.

In a fit of jealousy, Wanger walked up and twice shot and wounded the unsuspecting agent. One bullet hit Lang in the right thigh, near the hip, and the other penetrated his groin. Bennett said she did not see Wanger at first. She said she suddenly saw two livid flashes, then Lang slumped to the ground. As soon as she recognized who had fired the shots, she told Wanger, "Get away and leave us alone." He tossed the pistol into his wife's car.

She and the parking lot's service station manager took Lang to the agent's doctor. He was taken to a hospital, where he recovered. The police, who had heard the shots, came to the scene and found the gun in Bennett's car when they took Wanger into custody. Wanger was booked and fingerprinted, and underwent lengthy questioning. He was booked on suspicion of assault with intent to commit murder.

"I shot him because I thought he was breaking up my home," Wanger told the chief of police of Beverly Hills. Bennett denied a romance, however. "But if Walter thinks the relationships between Mr. Lang and myself are romantic or anything but strictly business, he is wrong," she declared. She blamed the trouble on financial setbacks involving film productions Wanger was involved with, and said he was on the verge of a nervous breakdown. The following day Wanger, out on bond, returned to their Holmby Hills home, collected his belongings and moved out. Bennett, however, said there would not be a divorce.

The following excerpt is from the book On Sunset Boulevard: The Life and Times of Billy Wilder (1998, p. 431) by Ed Sikov:

On December 14, Bennett issued a statement in which she said she hoped her husband "will not be blamed too much" for wounding her agent. She read the prepared statement in the bedroom of her home to a group of newspapermen while TV cameras recorded the scene. Wanger's attorney, Jerry Giesler, mounted a "temporary insanity" defense. Wanger then decided to waive his rights to a jury and threw himself on the mercy of the court. He served a four-month sentence in the County Honor Farm at Castaic, 39 miles north of Downtown Los Angeles, quickly returning to his career to make a series of successful films. During this time period Walter Mirisch of Allied Artists had Wanger's name put on Kansas Pacific (1953) as a producer, although he was still in prison. This allowed Wanger to receive a producer's billing, salary and profit participation. The entire experience with the criminal charges and jail sentence affected Wanger profoundly, and in 1954 he made the prison film Riot in Cell Block 11.

In David Niven's autobiography Bring on the Empty Horses, Niven recounts an incident in which Wanger stalked Errol Flynn and threatened to kill him, believing he also was having an affair with Bennett.

Partial filmography

 The Sheik (1921)
 The Cocoanuts (1929)
 The Lady Lies (1929)
 Roadhouse Nights (1930)
 Tarnished Lady (1931)
 Washington Merry-Go-Round (1932)
 Gabriel Over the White House (1933)
 The Bitter Tea of General Yen (1933)
 Going Hollywood (1933)
 Queen Christina (1933)
 The President Vanishes (1934)
 Private Worlds (1935)
 Every Night at Eight (1935)
 Shanghai (1935)
 Palm Springs (1936)
 The Trail of the Lonesome Pine (1936)
 History Is Made at Night (1937)
 Stand-In (1937)
 Blockade (1938)
 Trade Winds (1938)
 I Met My Love Again (1938)
 Stagecoach (1939)
 Eternally Yours (1939)
 Foreign Correspondent (1940)
 Slightly Honorable (1940)
 The Long Voyage Home (1940)
 The House Across the Bay (1940)

 Sundown (1941)
 Eagle Squadron (1942)
 Arabian Nights (1942)
 We've Never Been Licked (1943)
 Gung Ho! (1943)
 Ladies Courageous (1944)
 Salome Where She Danced (1945)
 Scarlet Street (1945)
 Night in Paradise (1946)
 Canyon Passage (1946)
 Smash-Up, the Story of a Woman (1947)
 The Lost Moment (1947)
 Secret Beyond the Door (1947)
 Tap Roots (1948)
 Joan of Arc (1948)
 Tulsa (1949)
 Reign of Terror (aka The Black Book) (1949)
 The Reckless Moment (1949)
 Lady in the Iron Mask (1952)
 Battle Zone (1952)
 Kansas Pacific (1953)
 Fort Vengeance (1953)
 Riot in Cell Block 11 (1954)
 The Adventures of Hajji Baba (1954)
 Invasion of the Body Snatchers (1956)
 Navy Wife (1956)
 I Want to Live! (1958)
 Cleopatra (1963)

References

Bibliography

Sources
 Bernstein, Matthew. Walter Wanger: Hollywood Independent. St. Paul, Minneapolis: University of Minnesota Press, 2000. .
 Schatz, Thomas. The Genius of the System: Hollywood Filmmaking in the Studio Era. New York: Simon & Schuster, 1989. .

 Chrissochoidis, Ilias (ed.). The Cleopatra Files: Selected Documents from the Spyros P. Skouras Archive. Stanford, 2013. .

Book
My Life with Cleopatra, by Walter Wanger and Joe Hyams. Publisher: Bantam, 1963. ASIN: B0007EIVZ0
My Life with Cleopatra: The Making of a Hollywood Classic, by Walter Wanger, Joe Hyams and Kenneth Turan (Afterword). Publisher: Vintage; Reprint edition, 2013.

External links
 
 Article on Wanger shooting Jennings Lang

1894 births
1968 deaths
Academy Honorary Award recipients
Film producers from California
American people of German-Jewish descent
Businesspeople from San Francisco
Presidents of the Academy of Motion Picture Arts and Sciences
20th-century American businesspeople
Burials at Home of Peace Cemetery (Colma, California)